The 2019 Federated Auto Parts 400 is a Monster Energy NASCAR Cup Series race that was held on September 21, 2019, at Richmond Raceway in Richmond, Virginia. Contested over 400 laps on the  D-shaped short track, it was the 28th race of the 2019 Monster Energy NASCAR Cup Series season, second race of the Playoffs and second race of the Round of 16.

Joe Gibbs Racing initially achieved a 1-2-3-4 finish for the team until Erk Jones was disqualified following the race for failing post-race inspection.

Report

Background

Richmond Raceway (RR), formerly known as Richmond International Raceway (RIR), is a 3/4-mile (1.2 km), D-shaped, asphalt race track located just outside Richmond, Virginia in Henrico County. It hosts the Monster Energy NASCAR Cup Series, the NASCAR Xfinity Series, and the IndyCar series. Known as "America's premier short track", it formerly hosted a NASCAR Gander Outdoors Truck Series race, and two USAC sprint car races.

Entry list
 (i) denotes driver who are ineligible for series driver points.
 (R) denotes rookie driver.

Practice

First practice

Final practice

Qualifying

Qualifying results

Race

Stage results

Stage One
Laps: 100

Stage Two
Laps: 100

Final stage results

Stage Three
Laps: 200

Race statistics
 Lead changes: 6 among 3 different drivers
 Cautions/Laps: 5 for 32
 Red flags: 0
 Time of race: 2 hours, 57 minutes and 27 seconds
 Average speed: 
 ^-Erik Jones became the first ever Cup driver under the new inspection rule to be disqualified due to failing post race inspection. Jones initially finished 4th.

Media

Television
NBC Sports covered the race on the television side. Rick Allen, Jeff Burton, Steve Letarte and three-time Richmond winner Dale Earnhardt Jr. had the call in the booth for the race. Dave Burns, Parker Kligerman, Kelli Stavast and Dillon Welch will report from pit lane during the race.

Radio
The Motor Racing Network had the radio call for the race, which was simulcast on Sirius XM NASCAR Radio. Alex Hayden, Jeff Striegle, and 6-time winner at Richmond Rusty Wallace had the call in the broadcast booth for MRN when the field raced thru the front straightaway. Dave Moody called the race from a platform when the field raced down the backstraightaway. Steve Post, Jason Toy, and Woody Cain called the action for MRN from pit lane.

Standings after the race

Manufacturers' Championship standings

Note: Only the first 16 positions are included for the driver standings.

References

Federated Auto Parts 400
Federated Auto Parts 400
NASCAR races at Richmond Raceway
Federated Auto Parts 400